Vel is a divine or spear associated with Murugan, the Hindu god of war.

Significance 
According to Shaiva tradition, the goddess Parvati presented the Vel to her son Murugan, as an embodiment of her shakti, in order to vanquish the asura Surapadman. According to the Skanda Purana, in the war between Murugan and Surapadman, Murugan used the vel to defeat all the forces of Surapadman. When a complete defeat for Surapadman was imminent, the asura transformed himself into a huge mango tree to evade detection by Murugan. Not fooled by asura's trick, Murugan hurled his vel and split the mango tree into two halves, one becoming a rooster, and the other a peacock. Henceforth, the peacock became his vahana or mount, and the rooster became the emblem on his battle flag.

Vel, as a symbol of divinity, is an object of worship in the temples dedicated to Murugan. The annual Thaipusam festival celebrates the occasion when Murugan received the divine vel from his mother. During this festival, some of the devotees pierce their skin, tongue or cheeks with vel skewers while they undertake a procession towards the Murugan temple.

Adi-vel is a major festival observed in Sri Lanka by Tamil Hindus in the month of July/August, known as Adi. The festival take place cities such as Katharagama and Colombo.

The alternative interpretation of vel is that it is a symbol of wisdom/knowledge. It symbolically shows that wisdom/knowledge should be sharp as in the vel's tip, as broad and tall as the javelin. Only such wisdom is supposed to be able to destroy the darkness of ignorance.

Gallery

See also
 Trishula
 Kaumodaki
 Sudarshana Chakra

References

External links
 vel Worship in Sri Lanka
 vel – Meaning & Definition

Weapons in Hindu mythology
Indian melee weapons
Kaumaram
Hindu mythology
Tamil mythology